Valley Creek, sometimes called Bolles Creek, is a small stream in Washington County, Minnesota, United States. It is one of the few remaining trout streams in the Minneapolis-St. Paul metropolitan area.

Valley Creek is notable as the location of the first private gristmill in Minnesota.  It was built in 1846 by Lemuel Bolles several hundred feet upstream from the confluence with the St. Croix. Bolles' nephew, Erastus Bolles, built an additional mill and a blacksmith shop farther upstream.

See also
List of Minnesota rivers

References

Rivers of Minnesota
Rivers of Washington County, Minnesota
Driftless Area
Tributaries of the St. Croix River (Wisconsin–Minnesota)